Constanze Angela Krehl (born 14 October 1956) is a German politician who served as a Member of the European Parliament (MEP) from 1994 to 2022. She is a member of the Social Democratic Party, part of the Party of European Socialists.

Education
After Krehl received her diploma from German secondary school in 1975 in Leipzig, she studied at the Technische Universität Dresden (Technical University Dresden) and graduated in computer science in 1980.

Political career
 1999-2005: Member of the SPD federal executive board
 1999-2004: Regional Chair of the SPD Saxony
 1996-1999: Regional Vice-Chair of the SPD Saxony
 February 1991 - June 1994: Observer of the European Parliament
 October - December 1990: Member of the "Deutscher Bundestag" (German Parliament)
 March - October 1990: Member of the "Volkskammer" (GDR People's Assembly)

Member of the European Parliament, 2004-2022
From 2004 to 2022, Krehl was a member of the Committee on Regional Development. She was also a member of the parliament's delegation for relations with the countries of Central America and the Delegation to the Euro-Latin American Parliamentary Assembly. Until 2004 she was a Member of the Committee on Budgets. From 2016, she served as the Parliament's own-initiative report on the EU's space strategy.

In addition to her committee assignments, Krehl served as chairwoman of the Delegation for relations with Russia from 1994 until 1997 and as chairwoman of the Delegation to EU-Russia Parliamentary Cooperation Committee from 1997 to 1999 and 1999–2002. She also served as a member of the European Parliament Intergroup on Western Sahara.

In the negotiations to form a coalition government under the leadership of Chancellor Angela Merkel following the 2017 federal elections, Krehl was part the working group on European policy, led by Peter Altmaier, Alexander Dobrindt and Achim Post.

Other activities
 IG Bergbau, Chemie, Energie, Member
 Socialist Youth of Germany – Falcons, Member

Recognition
In 1998 Krehl was awarded the Federal Cross of Merit.

References

External links

 
 
 

1956 births
Living people
TU Dresden alumni
Officers Crosses of the Order of Merit of the Federal Republic of Germany
Social Democratic Party of Germany MEPs
MEPs for Germany 1994–1999
MEPs for Germany 1999–2004
MEPs for Germany 2004–2009
MEPs for Germany 2009–2014
MEPs for Germany 2014–2019
MEPs for Germany 2019–2024
20th-century women MEPs for Germany
21st-century women MEPs for Germany
Politicians from Stuttgart